Zed is a New Zealand pop rock group, which formed as Supra in 1996 in Christchurch by Ben Campbell on bass guitar, Nathan King on lead vocals and guitar, and Adrian Palmer on drums. In 2000 they added a second guitarist, Andrew Lynch. Their debut album, Silencer (2000), peaked at No. 1 on the New Zealand Albums Chart; while their second album, This Little Empire (November 2003), reached No. 3. Their top 10 singles are "Glorafilia" (1999), "Renegade Fighter" (2000) and "Hard to Find Her" (2003). They toured New Zealand, Australia and United States before disbanding in 2004. They have reformed periodically including in 2017 and again in 2019.

History

Zed was formed in 1996 as Supra by students at Christchurch's Cashmere High School: Ben Campbell on bass guitar, Nathan King on lead vocals and guitar, and Adrian Palmer on drums. Initially playing cover versions of work by "Crowded House, Supergrass, Blur and Radiohead they started getting together in each other's bedrooms to practice the kind of hook laden pop music they were listening to." Campbell's father contacted talent manager, and former rock-and-roll artist, Ray Columbus. Columbus had them signed to a publishing deal for their original material and booked their early recording sessions. In 2000 they added Andy Lynch (Sensei Master) as second guitarist.

The band worked with producer David Nicholas on their debut album, Silencer (2000). Rhythm and vocal tracks were recorded at Revolver Studios in Auckland, with final overdubbing and mixing at Mangrove Studios, north of Sydney, Australia. Released in New Zealand later that year, Silencer, debuted at No. 1 on the New Zealand Album Charts, and was certified triple platinum. It provided in six top 40 singles with "Renegade Fighter" (2000) peaked at No. 4.

The band's second and final album, This Little Empire, was released with two different track lists, one for the New Zealand market in 2003, and another aimed at the United States the following year. In total Zed had ten top 40 singles in New Zealand.

Zed disbanded in 2004, they subsequently reunited for a few live gigs (a 2008 performance at Auckland's Vector Arena, and two corporate events in 2011). Nathan King launched a solo career, then later sang with band Paper Planes. Campbell and Lynch formed a new band, Atlas, which disbanded in late 2008. Lynch was working as a session musician in Auckland. In 2017 Zed reunited to perform live. and in 2019 they undertook a national tour to celebrate 20 years of Silencer.

Members

 Nathan King – vocals, guitar
 Adrian Palmer – drums
 Andy Lynch – guitar
 Ben Campbell – bass, vocals

Discography

Albums

Singles

References

External links
 

APRA Award winners
New Zealand pop rock groups